Raymond Alan Ogg (July 5, 1967 – November 1, 2009) was an American professional basketball player who spent three seasons in the National Basketball Association (NBA). He is the University of Alabama at Birmingham Blazers' career shot-blocking leader with 266 blocks over four college seasons. He was born in Lancaster, Ohio.

The 7'2" and 240-pound center Gardendale High School grad played collegiate basketball for the UAB Blazers and started his professional career when he signed with the Miami Heat as an undrafted rookie free agent during the 1990–91 NBA season. He became a fan favorite during his two seasons in Miami and split his playing time in his third and final NBA season with the Milwaukee Bucks and the Washington Bullets. He averaged 2.2 points and 1.7 rebounds during his NBA career. Ogg played overseas in Germany, China, Colombia, the Philippines, Puerto Rico and Paraguay before retiring from professional basketball in 2001. He had heart surgery in 2003. 
 
Ogg died aged 42 on November 1, 2009, in the UAB Hospital in Birmingham, Alabama, due to complications from a staphylococcal infection in his heart valve.

Career statistics

NBA

Regular season

|-
| align="left" | 1990–91
| align="left" | Miami
| 31 || 1 || 8.4 || .436 || .000 || .600 || 1.6 || 0.1 || 0.2 || 0.9 || 1.7
|-
| align="left" | 1991–92
| align="left" | Miami
| 43 || 0 || 8.5 || .548 || .000 || .533 || 1.7 || 0.2 || 0.1 || 0.7 || 2.5
|-
| align="left" | 1992–93
| align="left" | Milwaukee
| 3 || 0 || 8.7 || .333 || .000 || 1.000 || 2.0 || 1.3 || 0.3 || 1.0 || 2.7
|-
| align="left" | 1992–93
| align="left" | Washington
| 3 || 0 || 1.0 || .500 || .000 || .500 || 1.3 || 0.0 || 0.0 || 0.0 || 1.7
|- class="sortbottom"
| style="text-align:center;" colspan="2"| Career
| 80 || 1 || 8.2 || .493 || .000 || .568 || 1.7 || 0.2 || 0.2 || 0.7 || 2.2
|}

Playoffs

|-
| align="left" | 1991–92
| align="left" | Miami
| 3 || 0 || 5.0 || .333 || .000 || .500 || 0.3 || 0.0 || 0.3 || 1.0 || 1.0
|}

College

|-
| align="left" | 1986–87
| align="left" | UAB
| 31 || - || 10.6 || .456 || - || .625 || 2.4 || 0.0 || 0.4 || 1.0 || 2.3
|-
| align="left" | 1987–88
| align="left" | UAB
| 27 || - || 8.6 || .480 || - || .733 || 1.8 || 0.0 || 0.0 || 0.6 || 2.2
|-
| align="left" | 1988–89
| align="left" | UAB
| 34 || - || 26.3 || .573 || - || .712 || 6.1 || 0.7 || 0.5 || 3.8 || 9.8
|-
| align="left" | 1989–90
| align="left" | UAB
| 31 || - || 23.0 || .591 || - || .672 || 6.2 || 0.7 || 0.3 || 2.9 || 10.5
|- class="sortbottom"
| style="text-align:center;" colspan="2"| Career
| 123 || - || 17.6 || .559 || - || .689 || 4.2 || 0.4 || 0.3 || 2.2 || 6.4
|}

References

External links
Basketball-Reference.com: Alan Ogg
1990: Ogg's work is his strength Palm Beach Post
 Alan Ogg Biography

1967 births
2009 deaths
American expatriate basketball people in China
American expatriate basketball people in Colombia
American expatriate basketball people in Germany
American expatriate basketball people in Mexico
American expatriate basketball people in Paraguay
American expatriate basketball people in the Philippines
American men's basketball players
Basketball players from Ohio
Centers (basketball)
Columbus Horizon players
Deaths from staphylococcal infection
Hartford Hellcats players
Mexico Aztecas players
Miami Heat players
Milwaukee Bucks players
People from Lancaster, Ohio
People from Jefferson County, Alabama
Rochester Renegade players
Sichuan Blue Whales players
UAB Blazers men's basketball players
Undrafted National Basketball Association players
Washington Bullets players